All Them Witches is an American rock band from Nashville, Tennessee. The band consists of drummer Robby Staebler, vocalist/multi-instrumentalist Charles Michael Parks Jr., guitarist Ben McLeod, and keyboardist/multi-instrumentalist Allan Van Cleave.

History

Formation and early years (2012–2015) 
All Them Witches formed on January 6, 2012. Drummer Robby Staebler, having lost all of his money, had recently sold many of his possessions and moved to Nashville from Portland, at which time he was living in his car. The intention of the move had been for Staebler to play in another person's band; however, he left the project upon finding the other party difficult to work with. Staebler had created a rough collection of eight tracks – on which he played all instruments – and, being "in love with the sound," was looking for musicians to turn that project into a band.

Staebler recruited guitarist Ben McLeod after seeing him playing slide guitar at a bar. The pair originally attempted creating jazz music, but abandoned this in favor of a heavier sound. This was followed several months later by Staebler meeting frontman and bassist Charles Michael Parks Jr. while they were both working for "a corporate hippie store." Parks was shown a collection of demo songs created by Staebler and McLeod, which persuaded him to join.

The band's name is taken from a book of witchcraft, All of Them Witches, featured in the 1968 film Rosemary's Baby.

The band self-released their first, self-titled four-track EP in the same year as their formation. They then became the first American band to be signed to the German heavy psych record label, Elektrohasch Schallplatten. Their debut album, Our Mother Electricity (which had previously been self-released by the band in summer 2012), was released on Elektrohasch with new mastering and new artwork (by Mat Bethancourt) in February 2013. Soon after came their second EP, Extra Pleasant, which was recorded with two microphones directly to a four-track cassette tape recorder.

In 2013, the band's second studio album, Lightning at the Door, was self-released via their own Bandcamp page; it was later marketed by Tone Tree Music. Their next self-released album was the official live album At The Garage in February 2015.

New West Records (2015–present) 
In summer 2015, the band signed to New West Records. Later in the year, they released their third studio album (and their first with New West), Dying Surfer Meets His Maker, which was recorded in six days in a remote mountainside cabin, overlooking Pigeon Forge, Tennessee. The album's name was originally used by McLeod for a song in his solo project, Woodsplitter, inspired by a real-life incident where he almost died when surfing.

The band's previously self-released album, Lightning at the Door, was then re-released by New West in 2016. This was followed first by Live in Brussels (recorded live in Brussels, Belgium, in March 2016) in September 2016, then by the band's fourth studio album, Sleeping Through the War, in February 2017. Sleeping Through the War was produced by Nashville's Dave Cobb, who had worked previously with artists such as Sturgill Simpson and Chris Stapleton. The album featured guest vocals from three Nashville-based female vocalists: Caitlin Rose, Erin Rae, and Tristen, in addition to harmonica contributions from Mickey Raphael.

In mid-2018, it was announced that Jonathan Draper was replacing Allan Van Cleave on keyboards. In an interview at Download Festival 2018, Parks and Staebler made clear that the change was permanent, and that Van Cleave had left the band. Their next album, ATW, was released in September of that year; however, the following month, Parks announced that the band would be continuing as a three-piece, without Draper. ATW was produced by the band's guitarist, Ben McLeod, and mixed by producer Rob Schnapf, featuring a more simplified, naturalistic sound than their previous albums.

The band's first music as a three-piece was the non-album single "1X1," which was released on Halloween 2019. This was followed by their sixth studio album, Nothing as the Ideal, in September 2020. The album was recorded at Abbey Road Studios (in Studio Two, as previously used by The Beatles and Pink Floyd) and produced by Mikey Allred, who had also produced their earlier album, Dying Surfer Meets His Maker. In mid-August, shortly before the album's release, a video was released for the track "The Children of Coyote Woman." The video was directed by Staebler and starred himself alongside professional skateboarder Evan Smith. Metal Hammer named Nothing as the Ideal as the 46th best metal album of 2020.

In April 2021, the band announced via Facebook and Twitter that Van Cleave had rejoined the band as its keyboard player. Their first new release following Van Cleave's return was a cover of "Black Snake" by John Lee Hooker in January 2022. When announcing this new track, the band confirmed that it would be the first of a "Baker's Dozen" of tracks, which would be released on a monthly basis throughout 2022, along with one extra, for a total of 13. In March 2022, the band released digital audio and CD versions of their Live on the Internet livestream show, which had originally been broadcast in 2020 and made available on vinyl for Record Store Day in 2021.

Musical style and influences 
The band's musical style incorporates elements from multiple genres, such as hard rock, stoner rock, psychedelia, neo-psychedelia, blues, folk, and southern rock; however, Julian Marszalek of The Quietus noted that:"...this isn't blues of the "woke-up-this-morning" variety but one of malaise, anxiety and fear brought on a by [sic] world seemingly dead set on destruction; nor is this an escapist variant of psychedelia wherein one form of reality is jettisoned in favour of another for reasons of cheap thrills."Nick Pipitone of Monster Riff described how the band are "influenced just as much by Dr. John and Mississippi bluesman Junior Kimbrough as they are by Black Sabbath and progressive metal" and that their music can "venture from bluesy riffs and folk tales to spacey neo-psychedelic to punishing doom rock." Similarly, Rob Hughes of Classic Rock Magazine noted how "[All Them Witches are] as likely to create boiling riptides of bluesy psychedelia as they are pools of mystic folk and doomy ambience."

Vocalist and bassist Charles Michael Parks Jr., who is also the band's lyricist, has described international folk music as one of his biggest influences, and cited Pink Floyd, Grateful Dead, the Allman Brothers, early Fleetwood Mac, and Roy Buchanan as artists of which all band members are fans. Guitarist Ben McLeod additionally cites Jerry Garcia and The Doors as significant influences, beginning in his childhood. Drummer Robby Stabler cites Pink Floyd, Led Zeppelin, Miles Davis, Sun Ra, Santana, Neil Young, and Nick Drake.

All Them Witches are commonly compared with Black Sabbath; however, Parks has described this as misleading, because none of the band members listen to Sabbath. Other groups against which the band have been compared include Kyuss, Blue Cheer, Tool, Queens of the Stone Age, Pink Floyd, and Led Zeppelin.

Band members

Current members 

 Charles Michael Parks Jr. – bass, vocals (2012–present)
 Ben McLeod – guitar, vocals (2012–present)
 Robby Staebler – drums, vocals (2012–present)
 Allan Van Cleave – Rhodes piano, keyboards, violin (2012–2018, 2021–present)

Former members 

 Jonathan Draper – keyboards (2018)

Discography

Studio albums
 Our Mother Electricity (2012)
 Lightning at the Door (2013, re-released 2015)
 Dying Surfer Meets His Maker (2015)
 Sleeping Through the War (2017)
 ATW (2018)
 Nothing as the Ideal (2020)

Live albums
 At the Garage (2015)
 Live in Brussels (2016)
Live on the Internet (vinyl 2021, CD & digital 2021)

Extended plays 
 All Them Witches (2012)
 Extra Pleasant (2013)
 Effervescent (2014)
 A Sweet Release (2015)
 Lost and Found (2018)

Non-album singles
 "Ever Present" (2013)
 "Born Under a Bad Sign" (2013) – cover of the 1967 single by Albert King
 "George "Dubya" Kush" (2014)
 "Voodoo Chile" (2015) – cover of the 1968 album track by Jimi Hendrix
 "Under Pressure" (2016) – cover of the 1981 single by Queen and David Bowie
 "Go and Seek" (2017) – from Sounds of Lynchburg (where the band traveled to Lynchburg, Tennessee, home of Jack Daniel's whiskey, for inspiration)
 "1x1" (2019)
 "Blacksnake Blues" (2022) – cover of "Black Snake" by John Lee Hooker
 "Fall Into Place" (2022)
 "Silver to Rust" (2022)
 "Slow City" (2022) – cover of the 2000 album track by Pharaoh Overlord
 "Acid Face" (2022)
 "L'Hotel Serein" (2022)
 “6969 WXL THE CAGE” (2022)
 “Tiger's Pit” (2022)
 "Tour Death Song" (2022)
 "Holding Your Breath Across the River" (2022)
 "Hush, I'm on TV" (2022)

References

External links
Official website
Official Bandcamp page

American blues rock musical groups
Neo-psychedelia groups
Musical groups established in 2012
Musical groups from Nashville, Tennessee
2012 establishments in Tennessee
Musical trios